Miłosz Przybecki (born 2 January 1991) is a Polish professional footballer who plays as a right winger for KFK Kópavogur.

Career

Club
In February 2010, he was loaned to Ruch Radzionków from Promień Opalenica for a half-year deal.
In July 2010, he was sold to Ruch Radzionków and signed a three-year contract.

In July 2011, he joined Polonia Warsaw on a three-year contract and in January 2012, moved on a loan deal to Korona Kielce

On 23 October 2020, he joined Pogoń Siedlce on a one-season contract.

On 23 July 2022, he moved to Iceland to join the fifth division side KFK Kópavogur.

References

External links
 
 

1991 births
People from Śrem
Sportspeople from Greater Poland Voivodeship
Living people
Polish footballers
Poland youth international footballers
Poland under-21 international footballers
Association football midfielders
Sokół Pniewy players
Ruch Radzionków players
Polonia Warsaw players
Korona Kielce players
Zagłębie Lubin players
Pogoń Szczecin players
Ruch Chorzów players
Chojniczanka Chojnice players
MKP Pogoń Siedlce players
Ekstraklasa players
I liga players
II liga players
III liga players
Polish expatriate footballers
Expatriate footballers in Iceland
Polish expatriate sportspeople in Iceland